The following is a list of the Rulers of the Lunda Empire.  The Lunda Empire was a pre-colonial Central African state centered in the Democratic Republic of the Congo whose sphere of influence stretched into Angola and Zambia.  The Lunda were initially ruled by kings with the title Mwaantaangaand meaning "owners of the land".  This later became "Mwaantayaav" or "Mwaant Yaav" with the rise of Mbala I Yaav.

Mwaantaangaand of Lunda Kingdom
Mwaaka (c. 1500-c. 1516)
Yala Maaku (c. 1516-c. 1550)
Kunde (c. 1550-c. 1590)
Nkonda Matit (c. 1590-c. 1620)
Cibind Yirung (ruled c. 1620-c. 1630)
Yaav I a Yirung (ruled c. 1630-c. 1660)
Yaav II a Nawej (ruled c. 1660-c. 1687)

Mwaant Yaav of Lunda Empire
Mbal I Yaav (ruled c. 1687-c. 1719)
Mukas Munying Kabalond (ruled c. 1719-c. 1720)
Muteb I Kat Kateng (ruled c. 1720-c. 1748)
Mukas Waranankong (ruled c. 1748-c. 1766)
Naweej I Mufa Muchimbunj (ruled c. 1766-1775)
Cikomb Yaav Italesh (ruled 1775-1800)
Naweej II a Ditend (ruled 1800-1852)
Mulaj a Namwan (ruled 1852-1857)
Cakasekene Naweej (ruled 1857)
Muteb II a Cikomb (ruled 1857-1873)
Mbal II a Kamong Isot (ruled 1873-1874)
Mbumb I Muteba a Kat (ruled 1874-1883)
Cimbindu a Kasang (ruled 1883-1884)
Kangapu Naweej (ruled 1884-1885)
Mudib (ruled 1885-1886)
Mutand Mukaz (ruled 1886-1887)
Mbal III a Kalong (ruled 1887)

Mwaant Yaav under the Congo Free State
Mushidi I a Nambing (ruled 1887-1907)
Muteb I a Kasang (ruled 1907-1908, in rebellion from 1898)

Mwaant Yaav under the Belgian Congo
Muteb I a Kasang cont. (ruled 1908-1920)
Kaumbw Diur (ruled 1920-1951)
Yaav a Naweej III (ruled 1951-1960)

Mwaant Yaav under Katanga
Yaav a Nawej III cont. (ruled 1960-1962)

Mwaant Yaav under Republic of Congo
Yaav a Nawej III cont. (ruled 1962-June 1963)
Mushidi II "Lumanga" Kawel a Kamin (ruled 1963-December 1965)
Muteb II Mushid (ruled 1965-1971)

Mwaant Yaav under Zaire
Muteb II Mushid cont. (ruled 1971-27 November 1973)
Mbumb II Muteb (ruled 1973-1984)
Kawel II (ruled 1984-1997)

Mwaant Yaav under Democratic Republic of the Congo
Kawel II cont. (ruled 1997-27 January 2005)
Mushid III 2005-

See also
Lunda Empire
History of the Democratic Republic of the Congo

References

Lists of African monarchs
rule